The leiomano is a shark-toothed club used by various Polynesian cultures, but mostly by the native Hawaiians.

Leiomano is a word in the Hawaiian language and may have been derived from lei o manō, which means "a shark's lei."

The weapon resembles a thick ping-pong paddle inset with shark teeth. The tiger shark is the preferred source. These teeth are placed into grooves in the club and sewn into place. The tip of the handle also may utilize a marlin bill as a dagger. The weapon functions as a bladed club similar to the obsidian-studded macuahuitl of the pre-Columbian Mesoamerican cultures.

North America 
A culturally unrelated weapon of similar form was discovered in pieces at Cahokia, Illinois, in 1948 by Gregory Perino. Greatly damaged by a plow, the weapon was composed of eight chert imitation shark teeth, and tipped with five actual shark teeth. In both cases, the teeth were related to the great white.

See also
Macuahuitl

References

Clubs (weapon)
Hawaii culture
Polynesian culture